Bernard Gauthier (22 September 1924 – 23 November 2018) was a French road racing cyclist, who was professional from 1947 to 1961. He won the Bordeaux–Paris road race on four occasions.

Major results

1947
Circuit Lyonnais
Tour de France: 22nd place
1948
Tour de France: 24th place
Winner of stage 20
1950
Tour de France: 17th place
7 days in yellow jersey
1951
Bordeaux–Paris
Tour de France: 26th place
1952
Tour de France: 63rd place
Tour du Sud-Est
1953
GP du pneumatique
Montluçon
Tour de France: 75th place
1954
Bordeaux–Paris
Critérium du Dauphiné Libéré: 2 stages
GP Catox
1955
Tour de France: 46th place
Paris–Roubaix: 8th place
1956
French national road race cycling championship
Bordeaux–Paris
Paris–Roubaix: 5th place
1957
Bordeaux–Paris
1958
Tour du Sud-Est
1960
Tour de France: 79th place

References

External links

 
 

French male cyclists
French Tour de France stage winners
1924 births
2018 deaths
Sportspeople from Drôme
Cyclists from Auvergne-Rhône-Alpes